Lost versions of compositions by Johann Sebastian Bach can be reconstructed on the basis of extant versions of similar music. Reasons for such reconstructions include extension of the repertoire and testing hypotheses about the genesis history of known pieces. For instance, in the late 19th century it was discovered that Bach likely transcribed his Concerto for two harpsichords in C minor, BWV 1060, from a lost earlier version for violin and oboe. Reconstructions of BWV 1060 to its presumed original version, published from the 1920s, extended the Bach repertoire for oboists.

A more elaborate undertaking was the reconstruction of Bach's lost St Mark Passion, BWV 247: its libretto, printed in 1732, survived without music. Bach's two surviving Passions (St Matthew and St John) are among the composer's most often performed vocal works, and Bach's most popular oratorio, the Christmas Oratorio, written in the early 1730s like the St Mark Passion, was apparently to a large extent based on earlier compositions by Bach: a similar assumption was made for the St Mark. From the second half of the 20th century, there were several attempts to reconstruct the St Mark based on extant material from Bach's music library.

Since the 19th century, a violin concerto model has been suggested for Bach's first Harpsichord Concerto, BWV 1052: the violin concertos resulting from various reconstruction attempts seem to indicate, at least according to Peter Wollny, that for this harpsichord concerto there was likely no violin concerto model. In the 1980s Peter Williams suggested that the well-known Toccata and Fugue in D minor, BWV 565, for organ, may have been based on piece for violin: in this case the violin version reconstruction appeared to be more convincing. In the introduction of the 1990 second edition of the Bach-Werke-Verzeichnis (BWV), Wolfgang Schmieder suggested to indicate reconstructions by the addition of a "R" to the BWV number of the extant version of the composition on which the reconstruction was based, thus, e.g. the violin and oboe version of the BWV 1060 concerto would be numbered BWV 1060R.

Vocal music
Reconstructions of Bach's vocal music are often based on surviving lyrics, such as librettos, which show similarities with those of extant music, so that the variant text can be combined with the known music.

In vocal music, recitatives are often a particularly difficult challenge for reconstruction: when Bach parodied his own vocal music, he reused music of arias, duets and choruses for the new work, but recitatives with different lyrics were less suitable for such transcriptions. For example, when he adapted Vereinigte Zwietracht der wechselnden Saiten, BWV 207, one of his secular cantatas, into Auf, schmetternde Töne der muntern Trompeten, BWV 207a, for a different occasion, he reused the music of all movements except the music of the recitative movements 2, 4 and 6: he composed new music for the recitatives of the later work. An exception appears to have been when he parodied the Michaelmas cantata BWV 248a, recitatives and all, into the sixth part of his Christmas Oratorio: how exactly he proceeded with this adaptation can however not be ascertained while the text of the BWV 248a cantata went lost. Reconstruction of recitatives may depend on borrowing music of recitatives with somewhat similar lyrics (e.g. Simon Heighes 1995), or re-composing recitatives in the style of Bach (e.g. Ton Koopman 2000).

Reconstruction of chorale movements of lost church music is helped by the fact that hundreds of Bach's four-part chorales survive, including separate chorales such as BWV 253–438 and 1122–1126, which are most likely nearly exclusively chorale settings from otherwise lost larger vocal works. With some educated guesswork Bach scholars such as Friedrich Smend and Klaus Häfner have coupled extant chorale settings with hymn verses in librettos of otherwise lost works.

Cantatas

Bach likely composed around 300 church cantatas, of which around 200 are extant. In other words, nearly two of his five cantata cycles were lost: the larger part of what is conventionally indicated as his fourth and fifth cycles is lost. For his secular cantatas, less than half of the around 50 known works are fully extant. Several dozens of Bach cantata librettos survive without music, many of these by Picander, published in his Ernst-Schertzhaffte und Satyrische Gedichte: a few of these are at least partially reconstructible based on known works.

Examples of at least partially reconstructed Bach cantatas include:
 Steigt freudig in die Luft, BWV 36a
 Die Freude reget sich, BWV 36b
 Der Himmel dacht auf Anhalts Ruhm und Glück, BWV 66a
 Erwählte Pleißenstadt, BWV 216a
 Entfliehet, verschwindet, entweichet, ihr Sorgen, BWV 249a
 Entfernet euch, ihr heitern Sterne, BWV Anh. 9
 Böse Welt, schmäh immerhin, the cantata for Judica of Picander's 1728–29 libretto cycle, a 1983 reconstruction by Gustav Adolf Theill, based on music of the secular cantata BWV 209.

Passions, oratorios, and church music in Latin
Reconstructions range from small repairs (e.g. the last measures of laudes "D" of the Magnificat in E-flat major, BWV 243a), to reconstructions of entire Passions (e.g. several reconstructions of the St Mark Passion, BWV 247).

Instrumental music
Schmieder's suggestion to add a "R" to a BWV number to indicate a reconstruction was, in practice, nearly only applied to some of the concerto reconstructions.

Solo pieces
Reconstructions of Bach's instrumental music include the recasting of the Toccata and Fugue in D minor, BWV 565, for organ, as a surmised anterior version for solo violin.

Concertos

Reconstructions based on Bach's harpsichord concertos include:
 BWV 1050a: the early version of the fifth Brandenburg Concerto, BWV 1050, has only been incompletely transmitted. For instance, the violone part of the last two movements of that early version went missing. Alfred Dürr reconstructed the violone part based on a spurious cello part for the later version of the concerto.
 BWV 1052R: based on BWV 1052, 1052a and/or on cantata movements BWV 146/1 (Sinfonia) and /2 (Chorus), and/or on what is known regarding the lost opening Sinfonia of BWV 188 (a variant of the third movement of BWV 1052 scored for oboe, strings and obligato organ):
 Violin Concerto in D minor
 Organ Concerto in D minor
 BWV 1053R: based on BWV 1053 and/or cantata movements BWV 169/1 (Sinfonia), /5 (Aria) and 49/1 (Sinfonia):
 Oboe d'amore Concerto in D major 
 Oboe Concerto in F major
 Organ Concerto in D major
 BWV 1055R: based on BWV 1055:
 Oboe d'amore Concerto in A major
 BWV 1056R: based on BWV 1056 and/or (for the middle movement) BWV 156/1 (Sinfonia):
 Violin Concerto in G minor 
 Oboe Concerto in G minor
 BWV 1059R: based on the BWV 1059 fragment and on cantata movements BWV 35/1 (Sinfonia of Part I), 156/1 (Sinfonia) or 35/2 (Aria), and 35/5 (Sinfonia of Part II):
 Harpsichord Concerto in D minor
 Oboe Concerto in D minor
 Organ Concerto in D minor
 BWV 1060R: based on BWV 1060:
 Concerto for Violin and Oboe in C minor
 Concerto for Violin and Oboe in D minor
 Concerto for Two Violins in C minor
 BWV 1063R: based on BWV 1063:
 Concerto for Violin, Oboe and Flute in D minor
 Concerto for Three Violins in D minor
 BWV 1064R: based on BWV 1064:
 Concerto for Three Violins in D major

|- id="BWV 1052R"
| data-sort-value="1052.R00" | 1052R
| data-sort-value="448.154" | R
| data-sort-value="1970-07-01" | 1970
| Concerto
| D min.
| Vl Str Bc
| 
| data-sort-value="VII/7: 003" | VII/7: 3
| by Fischer; after BWV 1052
| data-sort-value="1236r" | 
|- id="BWV 1055R"
| data-sort-value="1055.R00" | 1055R
| data-sort-value="448.155" | R
| data-sort-value="1970-07-01" | 1970
| Concerto
| A maj.
| Oba Str Bc
| 
| data-sort-value="VII/7: 033" | VII/7: 33
| by Fischer; after BWV 1055
| data-sort-value="1240r" | 
|- id="BWV 1056R"
| data-sort-value="1056.R00" | 1056R
| data-sort-value="448.156" | R
| data-sort-value="1970-07-01" | 1970
| Concerto
| G min.
| Vl Str Bc
| 
| data-sort-value="VII/7: 059" | VII/7: 59
| by Fischer; after BWV 1056
| data-sort-value="1241r" | 
|- id="BWV 1060R"
| data-sort-value="1060.R00" | 1060R
| data-sort-value="448.160" | R
| data-sort-value="1970-07-01" | 1970
| Concerto
| C min.
| Vl Ob Str Bc
| 
| data-sort-value="VII/7: 075" | VII/7: 75
| by Fischer; after BWV 1060
| data-sort-value="1245r" | 
|- id="BWV 1064R"
| data-sort-value="1064.R00" | 1064R
| data-sort-value="448.164" | R
| data-sort-value="1970-07-01" | 1970
| Concerto
| D maj.
| data-sort-value="Vlx3 Str Bc" |3Vl Str Bc
| 
| VII/7: 103
| by Fischer; after BWV 1064
| data-sort-value="1250r" | 
|}

References

Sources

Further reading
 Butt, John.  "Reconstructing Bach."  Early Music. November 1998, 673–675.

 
Arrangements of compositions by Johann Sebastian Bach